The 2012 Mac Ice Classic is being held from October 3 to 8 at the RCMP Curling Club  in Ottawa, Ontario, as part of the 2012–13 Ontario Curling Tour. The men's event is being held in a triple knockout and women's event in a round robin format. The purse for the men's event is CAD$10,500, and CAD $6,000 for the women's event.

Men

Teams

Round-robin standings

Playoffs

Women

Teams

Round-robin standings

Playoffs

External links

Official Site

Mac Ice Classic